Judge's House and Law Office is a historic home and office located at Georgetown, Sussex County, Delaware.  The original structure was built by Justice Peter Robinson about 1810, as a -story, single pile, Federal style dwelling with a one-story, two bay southwest wing and one-story, three bay rear wing.  The southwest wing was later raised in the 1820s to  stories and rear wing raised to 2-stories.  In the 1840s, the interior was renovated in the Greek Revival style and the house shingled in cypress. The office was built in 1809, and is a one-story, cypress-shingled frame building, three bays wide, with a gable roof and rear wing.

The site was added to the National Register of Historic Places in 1979.

References

External links

Houses on the National Register of Historic Places in Delaware
Federal architecture in Delaware
Greek Revival houses in Delaware
Houses completed in 1810
Historic American Buildings Survey in Delaware
Houses in Georgetown, Delaware
National Register of Historic Places in Sussex County, Delaware
Law offices
Legal history of Delaware